Ertebrekers is a Belgian band from the province West Flanders in Flanders, the Dutch-speaking part of Belgium. The band name means 'heart breakers' in their local dialect. Their lyrics are in West Flemish, the Dutch dialect of the province of West Flanders, and their style has been described as a mixture of hip hop, groove and white soul. The band is composed of Flip Kowlier, Peter Lesage and Jeffrey Bearelle.

In their debut year, in March 2016, they already topped the Flemish Top 10, which is presented weekly by the local radio channel Radio 2.

Discography

Albums

Singles

References

Belgian hip hop groups